Pierre Dorion Jr. (born July 6, 1972) is a Canadian professional ice hockey executive. He is the general manager of the Ottawa Senators of the National Hockey League (NHL)

Career
Dorion was an amateur scout for the Montreal Canadiens for eleven years until 2005. He then joined the New York Rangers as a scout of amateur teams. Dorion joined the Ottawa Senators in July 2007 as chief amateur scout. In 2009, he was named director of player personnel. In 2014, Dorion and Randy Lee were both named assistant general managers after general manager Bryan Murray's nephew Tim Murray left his assistant general manager position to become the general manager of the Buffalo Sabres.

On April 10, 2016, Bryan Murray announced that he would be stepping down as the Senators' general manager and that Dorion would succeed him. Murray remained with the team as a senior advisor through the 2016–17 season up until his death in August 2017. Lee remained as assistant general manager. On February 10, 2018, the Senators announced that they signed Dorion to a three-year contract extension.

Personal life
Dorion has two children from a previous marriage. Dorion's father was also an ice hockey executive, having worked for the NHL's Central Scouting Bureau during the 1980s, spent a year as an assistant general manager in junior ice hockey with North Bay, and was the head scout for the Toronto Maple Leafs from 1990 until his death from a heart attack in 1994.

References

1972 births
Living people
Montreal Canadiens scouts
New York Rangers scouts
Ottawa Senators general managers
Ice hockey people from Ottawa